The Corowa-Rutherglen Football Netball Club, nicknamed the Kangaroos, is an Australian rules football and netball club based in the town of Corowa in New South Wales. Corowa-Rutherglen's football and netball squads formerly played in the Ovens & Murray Football League.

The club is notable for producing many VFL / AFL football players over many years, including John Longmire.

History
The club was formed in 1979 when the Corowa Spiders and the Rutherglen Redlegs merged to become the "Corowa-Rutherglen Roos".

Additionally surplus players formed the Rutherglen-Corowa Cats in 1979 and competed in the Coreen & District Football League for 13 seasons, before moving to the Ovens & King Football League for 11 seasons. Today the club is known as the Rutherglen Cats, dropping "Corowa" from their name in 2002, and have competed in the Tallangatta & District Football League since 2004.

In the 2016 Ovens & Murray FNL season it was announced that the Corowa-Rutherglen FNC would move the round 11 home match to Rutherglen's Barkley Park. This marked the first time a match was played in Rutherglen for premiership points since the 1981 Ovens & Murray FL season. Traditionally the Rutherglen Cats do not play on the Queen's Birthday Weekend as the town hosts the annual Winery Walkabout.

Accompanying the return was a pre-match luncheon with many guest speakers, including Rutherglen O&M Hall of Famer Bill Gayfer, Mick Gayfer, John Pearce, Corowa-Rutherglen's O&M Hall of Famer Jim Sandral, Dennis Sandral, John Clancy, and Peter Chisnall. At the luncheon it was suggested by Corowa-Rutherglen official Fred Longmire that both the Corowa-Rutherglen FNC & Rutherglen FNC could be run by a one-commission model, which would include three representatives from both clubs, an independent chairperson and a paid general manager to run 12 football and nine netball teams in the O&M and T&D football leagues.

Premierships
 Ovens & Murray Football League
 Seniors (2) 2000, 2003
 Seconds (2): 1986, 1992
 Thirds (3): 1983, 1984, 2000

VFL / AFL players 
The following players played with CRFNC prior to making their VFL / AFL senior football debut or were drafted to an AFL club.

 1981 - Darryl Henderson - 
 1986 - Michael Gayfer - 
 1988 - John Longmire - 
 1988 - Brett MacKenzie -  
 1988 - Mark O'Donoghue - 
 1994 - Damian Houlihan - 
 1995 - Jeff Bruce -  
 1997 - Brad Campbell - 
 1997 - Adam Houlihan -  
 1997 - Ben Mathews -  
 2000 - Ryan Houlihan -  
 2000 - Aaron Henneman - 
 2001- David Teague - 
 2002 - Robert Campbell - 
 1982 - Craig Horwood -  Played no senior AFL games
 1986 - Paul Bartlett -  Played no senior AFL games
 1993 - Paul Lewis -  Played no senior AFL games
 1999 - Adam Mathews -  Played no senior AFL games
 2001 - Joshua Houlihan -  Played no senior AFL games

Team of the Century (1903–2003)

Team ref
  Corowa (1903–78)
  Rutherglen (1903–78)
  Corowa-Rutherglen (1979–2003)

Notes
 1 G. Tobias was named in the Team of the Century for his career with the Corowa FC. He was also a foundation player for the Corowa-Rutherglen FC in 1979

See also
 Rutherglen Football Club (1893)
 Rutherglen Football Club
 Corowa Football Club

References

External links

 

Ovens & Murray Football League clubs
Sports clubs established in 1979
Australian rules football clubs established in 1979
1979 establishments in Australia
Netball teams in New South Wales